San Nazzaro is a comune (municipality) in the Province of Benevento in the Italian region Campania, located about 60 km northeast of Naples and about 12 km southeast of Benevento.

San Nazzaro borders the following comunes: Apice, Calvi, Mirabella Eclano, Pietradefusi, San Giorgio del Sannio, Venticano.

History
Up until 1958, San Nazzaro formed a single commune with present-day Calvi, named San Nazzaro Calvi.

References

External links
 Official website

Cities and towns in Campania